The 2020–21 Villanova Wildcats men's basketball team represented Villanova University in the 2020–21 NCAA Division I men's basketball season. Led by head coach Jay Wright in his 20th year, the Wildcats played their home games at the Finneran Pavilion  on the school's campus in the Philadelphia suburb of Villanova, Pennsylvania. However they did not play at Wells Fargo Center due to the COVID-19 pandemic. They are members of the Big East Conference. They finished the season 18-7, 11-4 in Big East Play to finish as regular season champions. They were upset in the quarterfinals of the Big East tournament by Georgetown. They received an at-large bid to the NCAA tournament where they defeated Winthrop and North Texas to advance to the Sweet Sixteen where they lost to the eventual champions Baylor.

Previous season
The Wildcats finished the 2019–20 season 24–7, 13–5 in Big East play to finish tied for first place. As the No. 2 seed in the Big East tournament, they were slated to play DePaul in the quarterfinals, but the  Tournament was cancelled at halftime of the first game of the quarterfinals due to the COVID-19 pandemic, along with the rest of the NCAA postseason.

Offseason

Departures

Preseason
The Wildcats were picked to win the Big East Conference in the coaches' poll, receiving nine first-place votes and a total of 99 points. Collin Gillespie and Jeremiah Robinson-Earl were selected to the Preseason First Team All-Big East, while Justin Moore was selected to the Preseason Second Team All-Big East. Villanova was considered one of the favorites to win a national title after returning most of its roster from the previous season, and was ranked third in the preseason Associated Press poll.

Roster

Schedule and results

|-
!colspan=12 style=|Regular season

|-
!colspan=9 style=|Big East tournament

|-
!colspan=9 style=|NCAA tournament

Rankings

^Coaches did not release a Week 1 poll.

References

Villanova
Villanova Wildcats men's basketball seasons
Villanova
Villanova
Villanova